Apollon Dimitrievich Lemondzhava (Georgian: აპოლონ ლემონჯავა; Russian: Аполлон Лемонджава; born 2 March 1991 in Georgia) is a Russian retired footballer.

Career

By 2011, Lemondzhava trialed with Schalke 04 in Germany, Vitesse in the Netherlands, FK Partizan in Serbia, Olympique de Marseille and Girondins de Bordeaux in France, and Atalanta in Italy.

In 2012, he signed for Bosnian top flight side FK Rudar Prijedor, where he made 10 league appearances and scored 1 goal. After that, Lemondzhava played for Dutch fourth division club Lienden and Croatian second division outfit HNK Gorica before joining Russian amateurs Rosich.

In 2015, he trialed with Persib Bandung, the most successful Indonesian team.

Lemondzhava is eligible to represent both the Russian and Georgian national teams.

References

External links
 Apollon Lemondzhava at Soccerway

Association football forwards
Association football midfielders
Russian footballers
Living people
1991 births